Father Goose is a 1964 American Technicolor romantic comedy film set in World War II, starring Cary Grant, Leslie Caron and Trevor Howard. The title derives from "Mother Goose," the code name assigned to Grant's character. Based on a story A Place of Dragons by Sanford Barnett, The film won an Oscar for Best Original Screenplay. It introduced the song "Pass Me By" by Cy Coleman and Carolyn Leigh, later recorded by Peggy Lee, Frank Sinatra and others.

Plot
While the Royal Australian Navy evacuates Salamaua in February 1942 ahead of a Japanese invasion, Commander Frank Houghton coerces an old friend, American beachcomber Walter Eckland, into becoming a coast watcher for the Allies. Houghton escorts Eckland to deserted Matalava Island to watch for Japanese airplanes. To ensure Eckland stays put, Houghton sees to it that his own ship "accidentally" knocks a hole in Eckland's launch while departing, so his only boat is a utility dinghy. To motivate Eckland, Houghton has his crew hide bottles of whisky around the island, rewarding each aircraft sighting (once it is confirmed) with directions to one of the bottles.

Eventually, Houghton offers Eckland a replacement (actually another coast watcher in need of rescue), but Eckland has to retrieve him from nearby Bundy Island by dinghy. He instead finds eight civilians stranded there who escaped from Rabaul: Frenchwoman Catherine Freneau and seven young schoolgirls (four British, two French and an Australian) under her care. She informs him that the man he came for was killed in an air raid. Eckland reluctantly takes the party back to Matalava with him, but there is no safe way to evacuate them.

The fastidious Freneau clashes repeatedly with the slovenly, uncouth Eckland; they call each other "Miss Goody Two Shoes" and "a rude, foul-mouthed, drunken, filthy beast," respectively. In the end, though, he adjusts to her and the girls, with Eckland getting one of the traumatised girls to speak again. Freneau learns that Eckland had been a history teacher before he became fed up and chose life in the South Pacific. Afterwards, Eckland cares for Freneau after they mistakenly believe she has been bitten by a deadly snake. With nothing else to do, he gives her whiskey; she gets drunk and speaks freely.

Now in love, the couple arrange to be married by a military chaplain over the radio, but strafing by a Japanese airplane interrupts the ceremony.

Since they have been detected, Houghton sends an American submarine, USS Sailfin, to pick them up, but an enemy patrol boat shows up first. Leaving Freneau and the schoolgirls in his dinghy, Eckland takes his now-repaired launch out to lure the Japanese vessel beyond the surrounding reef so the submarine can torpedo it. The Japanese sink the launch, but the submarine sinks the patrol boat. An uninjured Eckland, his wife, and the girls are picked up.

Cast
 Cary Grant as Walter Christopher Eckland
 Leslie Caron as Catherine Louise Marie Ernestine Freneau
 Trevor Howard as Commander Frank Houghton
 Jack Goode as Lieutenant Stebbings
 Peter Forster as the chaplain
 Simon Scott as submarine captain
 Ken Swofford as submarine helmsman

The children:
 Sharyl Locke as Jenny
 Pip Sparke as Anne
 Verina Greenlaw as Christine
 Stephanie Berrington as Elizabeth Anderson
 Jennifer Berrington as Harriet "Harry" MacGregor
 Laurelle Felsette as Angelique
 Nicole Felsette as Dominique

Production
Father Goose was filmed on location in Jamaica.

When Grant was asked by a Universal Pictures executive to read the short story, he liked it well enough to pass it along to Peter Stone, who told him he wanted to write the screenplay. Grant then arranged for him to be signed to Father Goose; Stone's contract called for a picture a year for five years.

The Japanese patrol vessel at the end of the film was portrayed by a former U.S. Coast Guard wood hull 83-foot WPB patrol boat. Director Ralph Nelson stated he tried to avoid professional child actors; with one exception, he succeeded.

Reception
The film grossed $12,500,000 at the domestic box office, earning $6 million in US theatrical rentals.

Time Out Film Guide panned the film, complaining, "It's a shame that Grant ... should have logged this sentimental claptrap as his penultimate film" and "Grant frequently looks as if he really didn't want to be there, wading lost in a sludge of turgid drama and pallid comedy." Film4 agreed, stating "the story all too slowly descends into sentimental sludge."

In its contemporary review, Variety found more to like: "Cary Grant comes up with an about-face change of character.... [He] plays an unshaven bum addicted to tippling and tattered attire, a long way from the suave figure he usually projects but affording him opportunity for nutty characterization. Leslie Caron and Trevor Howard are valuable assists to plottage...."

Bosley Crowther, The New York Times critic, considered it "a cheerfully fanciful fable" and "some harmless entertainment". Of the title character, he wrote, "It is not a very deep character or a very real one, but it is fun."

Awards and nominations
S. H. Barnett, Peter Stone, and Frank Tarloff won the Oscar for Best Writing, Story and Screenplay, which was written directly for the screen. Ted J. Kent was nominated for Best Film Editing and Waldon O. Watson for Best Sound. It received a nomination for the 1965 Golden Globe Best Motion Picture - Musical/Comedy award.

See also
List of American films of 1964

References

External links

 
 
 
 
 
 Stephanie Berrington McNutt, one of the child actresses and now a lawyer, talks about making the movie

1964 films
1964 romantic comedy films
1960s adventure comedy films
American adventure comedy films
1960s English-language films
Films directed by Ralph Nelson
Films scored by Cy Coleman
Films set on islands
Films whose writer won the Best Original Screenplay Academy Award
Pacific War films
Universal Pictures films
War adventure films
1960s American films